Bardevanhal (Baradevanal), is a panchayat village in Shorapur taluka of Yadgir district in Karnataka state, India. Bardevanhal is 4 km southwest of Kodekal, across the Dhon River. The nearest railhead is in Yadgir.

Demographics 
 census, Bardevanhal had 2,255 inhabitants, with 1,154 males and 1,101 females.

Notes

External links 
 

Villages in Yadgir district